Bateshwar is a village development committee in Dhanusa District in the Janakpur Zone of south-eastern Nepal. At the time of the 1991 Nepal census it had a population of 4,824 and had 888 houses.

References

External links
bateshwormun.gov.np officially website

UN map of the municipalities of Dhanusa District

Populated places in Dhanusha District